Bahadur Mohabir (born 19 November 1940) is a Guyanese cricketer. He played in two first-class matches for British Guiana in 1960/61 and 1961/62.

See also
 List of Guyanese representative cricketers

References

External links
 

1940 births
Living people
Guyanese cricketers
Guyana cricketers